Aaron Long may refer to:

 Aaron Long (animator) (born 1990), Canadian animator and filmmaker
 Aaron Long (soccer) (born 1992), American soccer player
Robert Aaron Long, perpetrator of the 2021 Atlanta spa shootings